Modern Marriages (German: Moderne Ehen) is a 1924 Czech-German silent comedy film directed by Hans Otto and starring Fritz Kortner and Helena Makowska.

Cast
 S. Polonsky as Prof. Holstein  
 Helena Makowska as Thea Holstein  
 Ernst Stahl-Nachbaur as Baron von Norden  
 Claude France as Baronin von Norden  
 Harry Nestor as Dr. Fritz Röller  
 Fritz Kortner as Diener  
 Ellen Reith as Baronin Elsa Bassian  
 Paul Askonas as Möller  
 William Dieterle as Prof. Heinrich  
 Dagny Servaes as Heinrichs Frau  
 Suzanne Marwille as Manon  
 Theodor Pištěk as Kwiatkowski  
 Mario Karas as Jirí Brodský  
 Joe Jencík as Ferry  
 Kamil Veselý as Mitglied der Kommission  
 Sasa Dobrovolná as Manons Tante  
 Bonda Szynglarski as Kellner 
 Ella Hrabánková as Kind / Tänzerin

References

Bibliography
 Grange, William. Cultural Chronicle of the Weimar Republic. Scarecrow Press, 2008.

External links

1924 films
Films of the Weimar Republic
Films directed by Hans Otto
German silent feature films
Czech silent films
UFA GmbH films
German black-and-white films
1924 comedy films
Czech comedy films
German comedy films
Silent comedy films
1920s German films